The Tell City Oddfellows' Hall was a building in Tell City, Perry County, Indiana, United States; also known as the "Hall of Tell City Lodge, No. 206, IOOF", it was constructed in 1894.  It served historically as an Independent Order of Odd Fellows meeting hall, as a multiple dwelling, as a specialty store, and as a business.

It was listed on the National Register of Historic Places in 1992 and was removed from the National Register in 2014.

References

External links
Fire
Removed from National Register

National Register of Historic Places in Perry County, Indiana
Cultural infrastructure completed in 1894
Odd Fellows buildings in Indiana
Buildings and structures in Perry County, Indiana
Clubhouses on the National Register of Historic Places in Indiana
Former National Register of Historic Places in Indiana